Pakistan women's national cricket team toured West Indies in October 2015. The tour included a series of four One Day Internationals (ODIs) and three Twenty20 Internationals (T20Is). Latter 3 of the 4 ODIs were part of the 2014–16 ICC Women's Championship.

Pakistan women's in the West Indies

Squads

1 Standby Players

Tour match

St Lucia Nat. Cric. Ass. President's Inv. XI vs Pakistani Women's

ODI Series

1st ODI

2nd ODI

3rd ODI

4th ODI

T20I Series

1st T20I

2nd T20I

3rd T20I

Pakistan women in the United States of America 

Being invited by USACA, Pakistan women played two T20s against hosts USA women.

Squads

1 Standby Players

T20I Series

1st T20I

2nd T20I

References

External links 
 Series home at ESPN Cricinfo

Women's international cricket tours of the West Indies
2014–16 ICC Women's Championship
International cricket competitions in 2015
West 2015
2015 in Pakistani cricket
2015 in West Indian cricket
2015 in women's cricket
Women 20150
2015 in Pakistani women's sport